Marciano José do Nascimento (12 July 1980 in Chapadinha, Piauí) is a Brazilian footballer who plays for Santa Quitéria.

During his spell with Moto Club de São Luís, he was loaned to Bosnian top league clubs NK Čelik Zenica, FK Sarajevo and NK Široki Brijeg. Afterwards, between January 2009 and January 2011 he played with Norwegian side Sandefjord Fotball in the Tippeligaen but returned to Bosnia when the club ended relegated by the end of 2010.

References

External links
Profile at Soccerway
Marciano at Zerozero

1980 births
Living people
Brazilian footballers
Brazilian expatriate footballers
Association football midfielders
Sportspeople from Piauí
Moto Club de São Luís players
FK Sarajevo players
NK Čelik Zenica players
NK Široki Brijeg players
Sandefjord Fotball players
Premier League of Bosnia and Herzegovina players
Eliteserien players
Expatriate footballers in Bosnia and Herzegovina
Brazilian expatriate sportspeople in Bosnia and Herzegovina
Expatriate footballers in Norway
Brazilian expatriate sportspeople in Norway